Kananen is a Finnish surname. Notable people with the surname include:

 Juho Kananen (1874–1955), Finnish smallholder and politician
 , Finnish politician
 Kimmo Kananen (born 1980), Finnish racing cyclist 

Finnish-language surnames